D. nivalis may refer to:
 Daphnia nivalis, a crustacean species
 Draba nivalis, a cruciferous plant species